Ilana Krausman Ben-Amos (born 1949) is an Israeli historian who researches early modern Europe. As of 2020, she is an associate professor of history at Ben-Gurion University of the Negev, Israel.

Biography

Krausman Ben-Amos is a social and cultural historian of early modern Europe, particularly early modern England. She studied for a BA and MA at the Hebrew University of Jerusalem and she gained her Ph.D. at Stanford University in 1986. Her topics of interest include the history of childhood and family, networks, social interactions and reciprocity, gift exchange, poverty, welfare and the history of the emotions.

Selected works
Books
 Adolescence and Youth in Early Modern England (New Haven and  London: Yale University Press, 1994).
 The Culture of Giving: Informal Support and Gift-Exchange in Early Modern England (Cambridge: Cambridge University Press, 2008, paperback edition, 2010).

Research articles
 "Failure to Become Freemen: Urban Apprentices in Early Modern England," Social History Vol. 16, No. 2, May 1991
 "Gifts and Favors: Informal Support in Early Modern England," The Journal of Modern History Vol. 72, No. 2, June 2000

References

External links
 Prof. Ilana Krausman Ben Amos at Ben Gurion University of the Negev 
 Faculty Page  at Ben Gurion University of the Negev [in Hebrew]

1949 births
Living people
Israeli historians
Israeli women historians
Contemporary historians
Historians of Europe
Academic staff of Ben-Gurion University of the Negev
Hebrew University of Jerusalem alumni